Neftalí Suescun Luna (born 14 March 1979 in Córdoba, Andalusia), known simply as Neftalí, is a Spanish retired footballer who played as a central midfielder.

External links

1979 births
Living people
Footballers from Córdoba, Spain
Spanish footballers
Association football midfielders
Segunda División players
Segunda División B players
Tercera División players
CD Toledo players
UD San Sebastián de los Reyes players
Atlético Levante UD players
CE Sabadell FC footballers
Alicante CF footballers
CE L'Hospitalet players
UB Conquense footballers
CD Guijuelo footballers